Hefeinan (Hefei South) railway station is a railway station located in Baohe District, Hefei, Anhui, China.

Hefei South railway station is also a comprehensive transportation hub; passengers can interchange between high-speed long-distance trains, long-distance and local buses, taxi, etc. Hefei Metro Line 1 are located at or near the bottom of station complex Metro station. Line 5 and Line 4 have also reached the centralized transfer center since 2020.

Station Structure

References

Railway stations in Anhui
Railway stations in China opened in 2014